The Diocese of Torcello or Diocese of Turris (Latin: Dioecesis Torcellanus) was a Roman Catholic diocese located in the town of Torcello in the province of Venice in northeastern Italy. In 1818, it was suppressed to the Patriarchate of Venice.

History
639: Established as Diocese of Torcello from the suppressed Diocese of Altino
1818 May 01: Suppressed to the Patriarchate of Venice
1968: Restored as Titular Episcopal See of Torcello.

Ordinaries

Diocese of Torcello
Erected: 640
Metropolitan: Patriarchate of Venice 

Geoffroy, O.P. (20 Jun 1253 – ) 
...
Filippo Paruta (2 Apr 1426 – 20 Feb 1448 Appointed, Archbishop of Candia) 
Domenico de Dominicis (20 Feb 1448 – 14 Nov 1464 Appointed, Bishop of Brescia) 
Placido Pavanello (5 Nov 1464 – 1471 Died) 
Simon Contarini (4 Sep 1471 – 1485 Died) 
Stefan Teglatije (de Taleazis) (5 Sep 1485 – 1514 Died) 
...
Girolamo Foscari (16 May 1526 Appointed – 2 Jan 1563 Died)
Giovanni Delfino (3 Jan 1563 – 26 Aug 1579 Appointed, Bishop of Brescia)
Carlo Pisani (26 Aug 1579 – 1587 Died) 
Antonio Grimani (patriarch) (26 Oct 1587 – Sep 1618 Resigned) 
Zaccaria della Vecchia (14 May 1618 – 1625 Died)
Marco Giustiniani (3 Mar 1625 – 27 Oct 1625 Appointed, Bishop of Ceneda)
Marco Zeno (20 Jul 1626 – 1643 Died) 
Marco Antonio Martinengo (13 Jul 1643 – Jul 1673 Died) 
Giacomo Vianoli (18 Dec 1673 – Nov 1691 Died) 
Marco Giustiniani (24 Mar 1692 – 2 Mar 1735 Died)
Vincenzo Maria Diedo (14 Mar 1735 – 13 Jul 1753 Died) 
Nicolò Antonio Giustiniani, O.S.B. (26 Nov 1753 – 12 Feb 1759 Appointed, Bishop of Verona) 
Marco Giuseppe Cornaro (Corner) (28 May 1759 – 6 Apr 1767 Appointed, Bishop of Vicenza) 
Giovanni Nani (10 Jul 1767 – 19 Apr 1773 Appointed, Bishop of Brescia) 
Paolo Da Ponte, O.C.D. (13 Sep 1773 – Mar 1792 Died) 
Niccolò Angelo Sagredo (18 Jun 1792 – 16 Aug 1804 Died)

1818 May 01: Suppressed to the Patriarchate of Venice

References

Former Roman Catholic dioceses in Italy